Ernestine Friedl (August 13, 1920 – October 12, 2015) was an American anthropologist, author, and professor. She served as the president of both the American Ethnological Society (1967) and the American Anthropological Association (1974–1975). Friedl was also the first female Dean of Arts and Sciences and Trinity College at Duke University, and was a James B. Duke Professor Emerita. A building on Duke's campus, housing the departments of African and African American Studies, Cultural Anthropology, the Latino/Latina Studies program, and Literature was named in her honor in 2008. Her major interests included gender roles, rural life in modern Greece, and the St. Croix Chippewa Indians of Wisconsin.

Early life
Born in Hungary in 1920, Ernestine Friedl emigrated to the United States with her parents at the age of two years. They settled in the West Bronx neighborhood of New York City.  Her father had been a railway functionary in Hungary but in the U.S. became a salesman, while her mother was a garment worker.

Education
Friedl attended Hunter College, a public women's college in the Upper East Side of New York, from which she graduated in 1941 with a Bachelor of Arts in pre-social work.

Friedl went to graduate school at Columbia University from 1941 to 1950, earning a Ph.D. in anthropology in 1950.

Influences
While in attendance at Hunter College, Friedl met three influential figures in her life: Dorothy L. Keur and Elsie Steedman, both professors of anthropology who taught and inspired Friedl to pursue the same field, as well as her future husband Harry Levy, who studied classics. It was Levy who encouraged Friedl to continue on with post-graduate studies in order to become an anthropologist. Other influences include Columbia professors Ralph Linton and Ruth Benedict.

Fieldwork
In 1942 and 1943, under the tutelage of Columbia professor Ralph Linton, Friedl studied the St. Croix Chippewa Indians of Wisconsin. She published a dissertation concerning the Chippewa political organization and leadership. After receiving her Ph.D. at Columbia, she and her husband Harry Levy traveled to Greece in 1954 where they engaged in anthropological fieldwork. She had been awarded a Fulbright grant to study life in a Greek village Vasilika, a small agricultural town with a population of 216 people. She returned to the area from 1964 to 1965 to do fieldwork with migrants. In 1971 and 1972, Friedl and Levy spent time in Athens working on her book Women and Men, which is when Friedl's interest in gender roles began.

Career
Friedl began teaching in at Brooklyn College in the fall of 1942. Other than a brief intermittent stint at Wellesley College and some courses taught at Queens College, she continued teaching at Brooklyn College until 1973 when she became a professor of anthropology at Duke University. She was elected a Fellow of the American Academy of Arts and Sciences in 1976. While at Duke, she was the chair of the Department of Anthropology from 1973 to 1978, and the Dean of Arts and Sciences and Trinity College from 1980 to 1985.

She served as the secretary and later the president of the American Ethnological Society in 1967. In 1970, Friedl participated in the Committee on the Status of Women in Anthropology as part of the American Anthropological Association, later serving as its president from 1974 to 1975.

Notable published works
1956 "Persistence in Chippewa Culture and Personality." American Anthropologist 58: 814–215.
1959 "The Role of Kinship in the Transmission of National Culture to Rural Villages in Mainland Greece." American Anthropologist 61: 30–38.
1962 Vasilika: A Village in Modern Greece. New York: Holt, Rinehart and Winston.
1963 "Studies in Peasant Life." Biennial Review of Anthropology. B Siegl, ed. Stanford, CA: Sanford University Press. 276–306.
1967 "The Position of Women: Appearance and Reality." Anthropological Quarterly. 40: 97–108.
1970 "Fieldwork in a Greek Village." Women in the Field. P. Golde, ed. Chicago: Aldine Press. 193–217.
1975 Women and Men: An Anthropologist's View. New York: Holt, Rinehart and Winston.
1978 "Society and Sex Roles." Human Nature. 1:8–75. Reprinted in "Culture and Conflict" in 1979. J. Spradley and D. McCurdy, eds.

References

1920 births
2015 deaths
American anthropologists
American expatriates in Greece
Brooklyn College faculty
Columbia Graduate School of Arts and Sciences alumni
Duke University faculty
Fellows of the American Academy of Arts and Sciences
Hungarian emigrants to the United States
Hunter College alumni
American women anthropologists
20th-century American women scientists
20th-century American scientists
21st-century American scientists
Jewish anthropologists
American women academics
21st-century American women